Hisatsugu ( or 尚嗣) is a masculine Japanese given name. Notable people with the name include:

Hisatsugu Suzuki (born 1970), Japanese sprinter
Konoe Hisatsugu (1622–1653), son of regent Nobuhiro and court noble of the Edo period 

Japanese masculine given names